Scharnstein is a municipality in the district of Gmunden in the Austrian state of Upper Austria.

Geography
Scharnstein lies in the heart of the Alm valley. About 55 percent of the municipality is forest, and 36 percent is farmland.

History
The municipality bears the coat of arms of its former lords, the Jörger von Tollet family.

References

Cities and towns in Gmunden District